The Zee Cine Awards 2013; one of the most coveted awards in Bollywood, were made in January 2013.

It was held in Mumbai, India after 10 years (2003)

Sponsors
2012 – Pan Bahar Zee Cine Awards

Awards

The winners are listed below.

Viewer's choice

Jury's choice

Technical awards

Other awards

See also
 Zee Cine Awards
 Bollywood
 Cinema of India

References

Zee Cine Awards

de:Zee Cine Award/Bester Liedtext